Glyphipterix clearcha is a species of sedge moth in the genus Glyphipterix. It was described by Edward Meyrick in 1921. It is found on Java.

References

Moths described in 1921
Glyphipterigidae
Moths of Indonesia